Yangsanshi is a subdistrict of Liling City in Hunan Province, China. The subdistrict was established in 1985. As of 2015, the town had a population of 52,200 and an area of 37.23 square kilometers.

References

External links
 official website
 About the boundaries of Yangshanshi 

Divisions of Liling